Jingle Jam is the annual hip-hop concert held at the XL Center and sponsored by Hartford-based radio station Hot 93.7 (WZMX-FM). Held in December, the concert features the most popular acts that hip-hop and R&B have to offer in a particular year.

2008 Jingle Jam performers 
 Paperboyz
 Ricky Blaze
 Slim of 112
 Jadakiss (with guests Styles P & Sheek Louch)
 Busta Rhymes (with guests Spliff Star & Ron Browz)
 T-Pain (with guest Busta Rhymes)
 T.I.

2007 Jingle Jam performers 
 B5
 Bow Wow
 Cassidy
 The-Dream
 Hurricane Chris
 Mr Vegas
 T-Pain
 Trey Songz
 Soulja Boy Tell 'Em

2006 Jingle Jam performers 
 Akon
 Cherish
 Ciara
 Elephant Man
 Jim Jones
 Lloyd
 Ludacris

2005 Jingle Jam performers 
 Juelz Santana
 Sean Paul
 Tami Chynn
 Toxic

2004 Jingle Jam performers 
 The Game
 Lady Saw
 Mario
 Slick Rick

See also
 List of hip hop music festivals
 Hip hop culture

Hip hop music festivals in the United States
Music festivals in Connecticut